The Wolves of Willoughby Chase is a 1989 dark fantasy film directed by Stuart Orme (in his theatrical directorial debut) with a screenplay by William M. Akers. The film was based on the 1962 novel of the same name, written by Joan Aiken.

Plot
  
Like the book, the film is set in an alternative-history version of nineteenth century England where packs of wolves roam the countryside.

Bonnie Green is the spoiled daughter of Lady Willoughby, who live at the country estate of Willoughby Chase. Lady Willoughby is ill, and her father plans to take a convalescence to the Mediterranean Sea. Meanwhile, in London, Bonnie's cousin, Sylvia, is leaving her Aunt Jane to keep Bonnie company while her parents are away. While travelling on a train, she meets a mysterious man named Grimshaw. At Willoughby Chase, a beautiful middle-aged woman arrives, revealing herself to be Bonnie and Sylvia's fourth cousin and their new governess, Letitia Slighcarp. The following morning, Bonnie sneaks into the carriage meant to pick up Sylvia, taking with her a rifle. When the train arrives at the station, Mr. Grimshaw is knocked unconscious after wolves attempt to attack the train. Bonnie and Sylvia take Mr. Grimshaw with them back to Willoughby Chase. Not long after, Bonnie's parents leave for their convalescence aboard the Thessaly.

The next day, Bonnie and Sylvia go out on a sleigh and are almost attacked by wolves until they are rescued by Simon, a boy who lives in a cave and raises geese. The girls return in the night to discover that Miss Slighcarp has dismissed all of the servants except for James and Pattern. During dinner, Miss Slighcarp refuses to give an explanation on the servants' dismissal, gives the girls porridge instead of their usual feast and harshly reprimands Bonnie after she accidentally spills a glass of milk on her father's farewell letter; thus Bonnie begins to suspect her governess's true cold and evil nature.

The day after, Bonnie and Sylvia catch Miss Slighcarp in Lady Willoughby's best dress. Bonnie demands she take it off and eventually throws a pot full of water on Miss Slighcarp yelling, 'I hate you!' Miss Slighcarp then locks Bonnie in a wardrobe in the schoolroom, and Sylvia sees that Miss Slighcarp has ordered James to rid of all the toys. Sylvia steals the key from Miss Slighcarp, who is bathing (and is actually bald), and frees Bonnie. They discover a secret passage and overhear a conversation in which Miss Slighcarp reveals she has forged a copy of Lord Willoughby's will (with Mr. Grimshaw's help, as he is a master forger as well as her ally) and prearranged the sinking of the Thessaly ship by paying the captain in an attempt to claim the Willoughby fortune. Mr. Grimshaw throws the real will into the fireplace but Bonnie and Sylvia rescue the remaining part of it. Bonnie pretends to have gone manic after being in the cupboard too long, in an attempt to lure Dr. Morne to rescue them. The plan fails as Sylvia is caught by Mr. Grimshaw, and Miss Slighcarp burns the letter addressed to Dr. Morne.

To get them out of her way Slighcarp rides a carriage with the girls aboard and takes them to an orphanage in the industrial town of Blastburn, run by the widowed Gertrude Brisket (an old friend of Slighcarp's) and her teenage son Rupert, where they are forced to work in a laundry with dangerous machinery that keeps breaking down from improper maintenance; on one such case, a small boy named Joey tries to help Sylvia when she is about to fall, but is prevented to do so by Bonnie for his own safety, and she saves her cousin. Some time later, Joey dies due to asphyxiation with a bed sheet after he accidentally falls into one of the laundry tubs. Meanwhile, Miss Slighcarp gets a newspaper from Blastburn with the headline, 'Thessaly Sunk!' thus she decides to return to Blastburn. During the journey, Simon sneaks into the carriage unnoticed. In Blastburn, Slighcarp tells Brisket she will be able to join her in Willoughby Chase after inheriting Lord Willoughby's fortune, and that they will have to dispose of the girls.

Bonnie and Sylvia are locked in a coal room, and Simon attempts to help them. When they are discovered trying to escape, Rupert and Miss Slighcarp chase Bonnie and Sylvia through the entire facility, but in the process Rupert falls into two rollers meant for clothing and gets crushed to death. Slighcarp informs Brisket of the girls' escape and of her son's death. Brisket is deeply grieved by losing her son, and weeps, but Slighcarp simply retorts 'You can mourn later, they've escaped!' Simon and the girls escape in the carriage Slighcarp travelled in and when they finally arrive at the grounds of Willoughby Chase, they use a horse-drawn sleigh. But Miss Slighcarp and Brisket follow in a motorized sleigh, as well as a pack of ravenous wolves. Brisket is killed when Slighcarp accidentally pushes her off the sleigh and she is eaten by wolves. Slighcarp then loses control of the sleigh which explodes due to overheating of the mechanism causing her to fly out; thus she is presumed dead.

James is informed that the Willoughbys have been saved, and he and Pattern capture Mr. Grimshaw as he attempts to escape. Bonnie and Sylvia return to the Chase where they eat some food and afterwards change into clean dresses. Unfortunately some wolves infiltrate the household and begin to chase the girls through the manor. When they try to escape, in order to arrive at Simon's cave, Miss Slighcarp unexpectedly emerges from the back kitchen door. Incredibly she has survived the sleigh's explosion, but her once beautiful face has now become horribly disfigured by serious burns and her elegant clothes have become charred rags. She threatens to drown Sylvia in a basin and tries to stab Bonnie with kitchen knives, but she is bravely attacked back by Bonnie who pushes her into the stove and sets her dress on fire, causing her to flee the house shrieking in panic. Just after, Lord and Lady Willoughby return from their recuperation, having survived the sinking of the ship and being stranded on a tropical island. Slighcarp, exhausted, wounded and defeated, is devoured by wolves near the grounds.

A short time later, Grimshaw is arrested after trying to steal all the estate's silver, amazingly showing no resistance and saying joyously that it is a miracle. Lord Willoughby decides to give Aunt Jane the mansion's East Wing, so that she has a place to live and Sylvia does not have to leave her cousin behind.

Cast
Stephanie Beacham as  Letitia Slighcarp
Mel Smith as  Mr. Grimshaw
Emily Hudson as  Bonnie Willoughby
Aleks Darowska as  Sylvia
Geraldine James as  Gertrude Brisket
Richard O'Brien as  James
Jane Horrocks as  Pattern
Lynton Dearden as  Simon
Jonathan Coy as  Lord Willoughby
Eleanor David as  Lady Willoughby
Gillian Hanna as  Mrs. Shubunkin
Dilys Hamlett as  Aunt Jane
Abbie Dabner as  Rupert Brisket
Jirí Lábus as  Dr. Morne
Rebecca Callard as  Emma
William Martin as  Joey
Trevor Byfield as  Train Driver
Robert Hamilton as  Coal Man

Music
Colin Towns' original score to The Wolves of Willoughby Chase was released in 1995 by Digital TER Records. Unfortunately the album only includes cues of certain scenes while the rest of the score remains unreleased or incomplete; such as Letitia Slighcarp's arrival to Willoughby Chase, the scene where Slighcarp locks Bonnie in the schoolroom wardrobe, the dismissal of the servants, the introduction before the journey to Blastburn, the entire first portion of the chase sequence in the Blastburn workhouse and the final moments of the motorized sleigh sequence, among others.

Track listing

Willoughby House - 2:15
Main Theme - 2:09
Rocking Horse - 1:38
Bonnie Collects Sylvia - 4:07
Playing in the Snow - 1:32
Simon's Cave - 3:11
Slighcarp in the Bath - 1:55
Secret Passage - 2:24
Journey to Blastburn - 1:47
Mrs. Brisket - 0:59
Home Thoughts - 1:34
Collage - 1:30
Dangerous Laundry - 2:02
Quick They've Escaped - 1:50
The Ski Sledge - 2:51
Theme - 0:19
Slighcarp the Witch - 1:28
The Parents Return - 1:36
Sufficient for Her Needs - 0:54
Main Themes - 3:04

References

External links
 

1989 films
1989 directorial debut films
British alternative history films
Films based on children's books
British fantasy films
Films set in England
Films set in the 19th century
Films based on British novels
Films scored by Colin Towns
1980s English-language films
1980s British films